Knocknahur, also known as Ransboro, is a village in County Sligo, Ireland.

Evidence of ancient settlement in the area includes examples of ringforts, souterrains and enclosures in the neighbouring townlands of Knocknahur North and Knocknahur South. The megalithic complex at Carrowmore lies approximately 1 km east of the village.

The area is home to Ransboro National School, the church of Our Lady Star of the Sea (in the Roman Catholic Diocese of Elphin)  and the grounds of Coolera/Strandhill GAA club at Ransboro Park.

See also
 List of towns and villages in Ireland
 R292 road (Ireland)

References

Towns and villages in County Sligo